Pakasua is a village in the island of Banggai in Banggai district, Banggai Laut, Central Sulawesi province. The village is part of the Kokini with its neighbors, Lelang village.

See also
 Banggai

Banggai Laut Regency
Populated places in Central Sulawesi